André Antunes Santos (born 20 July 1988) is a Portuguese professional footballer who plays for Caldas S.C. as a midfielder or a right back.

Club career
Born in Torres Vedras, Lisbon District, Santos spent the vast majority of his senior career in the third division after starting out at local club S.C.U. Torreense. In 2012, he signed with C.D. Feirense from the Segunda Liga.

Santos made his professional debut on 11 August 2012, playing 55 minutes in the 1–3 league loss away against C.F. Os Belenenses. During his one-and-a-half-year tenure at the Estádio Marcolino de Castro, he appeared in 46 competitive matches.

In the summer of 2014, Santos returned to the third level after joining Caldas SC.

References

External links

1988 births
Living people
People from Torres Vedras
Portuguese footballers
Association football defenders
Association football midfielders
Association football utility players
Liga Portugal 2 players
Segunda Divisão players
S.C.U. Torreense players
Sertanense F.C. players
C.D. Feirense players
Caldas S.C. players
Portugal youth international footballers
Sportspeople from Lisbon District